Kuyateh is a surname. Notable people with the surname include:

Brima Dawson Kuyateh, Sierra Leonean journalist
Dembo Konte and Kausu Kuyateh, West African kora players
Jaliba Kuyateh, Gambian musician

Surnames of African origin